Uddhab Barman is an Indian communist politician.  He was the former Assam State Committee Secretary of the Communist Party of India (Marxist) and a Member of the Legislative Assembly of Assam, elected from the Sorbhog constituency. He was elected to the Lok Sabha twice from Barpeta, in 1991 and 1996. He was a member of the Central Committee of CPI(M).

He is married to Madhuri Devi.

References 

Communist Party of India (Marxist) politicians from Assam
Tripuri people
Living people
India MPs 1991–1996
India MPs 1996–1997
Lok Sabha members from Assam
Communist Party of India (Marxist) candidates in the 2014 Indian general election
Assam MLAs 2006–2011
People from Barpeta
1944 births